Armenian Distance Learning Network (ADLN) is the first Armenian e-learning project. The project was launched in early 2002 and was restructured and updated in January, 2006. ADLN courses are business based and target Armenian speaking users of the Internet. The project was designed as a contribution to the development of Armenian beginner entrepreneurs who wish to be involved in the growth of e-business in Armenia as well as the country’s general e-growth.  The web-page language is Armenian; the system is based on a course management system - Moodle.

History 

The e-project ADLN was the first step to develop an e-learning community in Armenia and form a positive attitude towards the phenomenon. First e-course implemented by ADLN was entitled “Electronic Commerce”. The course materials were based on the first e-commerce book in Armenian Language “E-commerce” (2004) written by Albert Poghosyan. Fifty participants from all over Armenia were involved in the course, which offered also after course consultation opportunities if the participants express a desire to develop their own e-projects. After the graduation, the participants received a certificate together with the upper mentioned book. The second e-course that attracted more than 150 participants was entitled “Electronic Marketing” (2006). ADLN had 60 graduates that completed the whole learning and assessment process.  The third e-course entitled “PR in the new era of communication” is in the process of development. All courses are conducted only in Armenian, thus the course development and adaptation process is considered to be of high importance. 
The system is connected to the Armenian Electronic Payment System - EDram, as well as international on-line & credit card payment systems thus the users are able to register both – on-line and off-line. 
System tools of the ADLN system are: 

Learning Content
Learner Content
Administrative Content
Assessment 
Forum
Chat
Library
E-course additional resources
Calendar – individual scheduling 
On-line support 
Feedback

External links 
 ADLN web site

Education in Armenia
Internet in Armenia